Lisa Gabrielle Tucker (born June 13, 1989) is an American singer, musical theater actress, and television actress who was the tenth-place finalist on the fifth season of American Idol. At the age of 10, she landed the role as Young Nala in the Los Angeles production of The Lion King.

After American Idol, she performed in the American Idols Live! Tour 2006 for three months and 60 concerts across the United States.  After the tour, Tucker recorded a duet with Dionne Warwick on Warwick's album, My Friends & Me.  Shortly after, Tucker landed recurring television roles on Zoey 101, The Game, The Vampire Diaries, and The O.C., where she played herself.

Life and career

Early life and career beginnings
Tucker was born in Anaheim, California to Stanley and Eleanor Tucker, and raised in Anaheim, California, along with her two older brothers: Stanley III and William.

At nine, she was encouraged by her parents to audition for a production of The Little Princess at the Orange County Children's Theater and she landed a lead role. Tucker was selected to sing the national anthem at an Anaheim Angels baseball game.

At ten, Tucker landed the role of young Nala in The Lion King. Resident director of The Lion King, Frank Lombardi, wrote about Tucker: "Her talent is extraordinary.  So much so that upon realizing her skills as a singer, one of our composers added a complex vocal arrangement to one of the original songs.  Lisa sang with a simplicity and beauty that made it seem effortless, even though it actually took great skill and concentration."

When Tucker was 13, she auditioned for Star Search and made it to the finals and was runner-up to Tiffany Evans. Tucker attended La Palma, California's John F. Kennedy High School, graduating in 2006.

American Idol
At the age of 16, she auditioned for the fifth season of American Idol in Denver, Colorado with One Moment in Time by Whitney Houston where she amazed the judges, with Simon Cowell declaring, "Wow.  I think the best 16-year-old we've ever had throughout this whole competition."  Later, the judges made a unanimous decision to put her through to the season's final 24. America voted her through to the top 12. While she was on American Idol she attended high-school classes with former Idol finalists Paris Bennett and Kevin Covais. Tucker was eliminated on March 29, 2006, after being in the bottom 3 with Katharine McPhee and Ace Young.  Tucker came in tenth place, allowing her to perform on the Idol tour singing Elton John's "Your Song" and "Someone Saved My Life Tonight" on piano.

Post-Idol

Tucker has performed at numerous local events in Orange and Los Angeles counties including singing the national anthem at Lakers, Clippers, Angels, and Mighty Ducks games. She sang on the city of Anaheim float in the 118th Tournament of Roses parade. Tucker was invited to tour the U.S. Air Force bases in Europe to promote the kickoff of the annual USAFE Services Xtreme Summer Program.

She made a guest appearance on The O.C. playing herself in the prom episode. She was in the third and fourth seasons Zoey 101 as Lisa Perkins; her first appearance was in the episode "Michael Loves Lisa", which aired on January 7, 2007.  In August 2007, Tucker was featured on the reality TV show "Dr. 90210" as the singing instructor for Dr. Rey's children. She was cast for the pilot of the FOX series Born in the USA, also by 19 Entertainment. She had a recurring role on The Game, where she played Pucci Wright in the third season.  She also had a recurring role as Greta Martin in The Vampire Diaries.

Tucker sang "Then Came You" with Dionne Warwick on Warwick's new album, My Friends & Me.

Tucker performed as a special guest at Lord Rhaburn's Music Awards Show in Belize.

Tucker was formerly signed to recording artist Ne-Yo's production company Compound Entertainment and had a recording deal through Island Def Jam.

Discography

Filmography

References

External links
 Lisa Tucker on Instagram
 

1989 births
Actresses from Orange County, California
20th-century African-American women singers
American child singers
American Idol participants
American people of Belizean descent
Living people
Musicians from Anaheim, California
Musicians from Newport Beach, California
Singers from California
Actresses from Newport Beach, California
American television actresses
African-American actresses
American musical theatre actresses
21st-century American women singers
21st-century American singers
21st-century African-American women singers